Walker Burrell Banks Jr. (born August 26, 1947) is an American former  basketball player who played one season in the American Basketball Association (ABA).

He played collegiality for the Western Kentucky University.

He was selected by the New York Knicks in the ninth round (153rd pick overall) of the 1970 NBA draft.

He played for the Pittsburgh Condors (1970–71) in the ABA for 16 games.

Undefeated State Champions 1966, Tournament MVP, 1st Team All State,  ranked #2, high game 49 points against Alleghany High School and 40 against Lexington Downing High School. Honorable Mention All American.

External links

1947 births
Living people
American men's basketball players
Basketball players from Virginia
Centers (basketball)
New York Knicks draft picks
Pittsburgh Condors players
Western Kentucky Hilltoppers basketball players